Gerald Markowitz is an American historian, currently a Distinguished Professor at John Jay College of Criminal Justice, City University of New York and also a published author.

References

Living people
21st-century American historians
21st-century American male writers
City University of New York faculty
Year of birth missing (living people)
American male non-fiction writers